Man of the World 2022 was the 4th edition of the Man of the World pageant, held on 18 June 2022 in Baguio, Philippines. Daniel Georgiev, 27, of Bulgaria, who won the third edition on July 11, 2019, was dethroned so his runner-up Jin Kyu Kim South Korea crowned Aditya Khurana of India at the end of the event.

Results

Special Awards  

Order Of Announcements

Top 15
 

Top 10

 

Top 5

Contestants

Notes

Crossover 
Major competitions
 Mister Supranational
 2019:  - Chang Wook Woo

 Mister Global
 2019:  - Branden Allen Cruz
 
 Men Universe Model
 2018:  - Branden Allen Cruz

Minor competitions
 Mister Friendship
 2021:  - Chang Wook Woo

References 

2022 beauty pageants
Man of the World (pageant)